Saccharopolyspora dendranthemae is a halotolerant bacterium from the genus Saccharopolyspora which has been isolated from the stem of the plant Dendranthema indicum in Nantong in China.

References

 

Pseudonocardineae
Bacteria described in 2014